The Gypsy Queen is a 1913 American silent short comedy film directed by Mack Sennett and featuring Roscoe Arbuckle and Mabel Normand.

Cast
 Roscoe "Fatty" Arbuckle
 Mabel Normand
 Nick Cogley

See also
 List of American films of 1913
 List of comedy films before 1920

References

External links
 
 

1913 films
1913 comedy films
1913 short films
Silent American comedy films
American silent short films
American black-and-white films
Films directed by Mack Sennett
American comedy short films
1910s American films